ROCS Tso Ying (DDG-1803) (左營) is a Kee Lung-class guided-missile destroyer currently in active service of Republic of China (Taiwan) Navy. It was formally commissioned at Suao Naval Base in northeastern Taiwan on 3 November 2006 along with sister ship . Tso Ying is named after the largest naval base in Taiwan, the Tso Ying Naval Base in Tsoying District, Kaohsiung City at southern Taiwan. The Tso Ying Naval Base is also the location of the Republic of China's naval academy and fleet headquarters.

Tso Ying, formerly , the lead ship of her class of destroyers for the United States Navy, was purchased by the Republic of China in 2004. Her new name in ROCN service was originally planned to be , which is a transliteration of "Kidd" into Chinese.

References 
 

 

Kidd-class destroyers
Kee Lung-class destroyers
Ships built in Pascagoula, Mississippi
1979 ships
Destroyers of the Republic of China